was a close person confidant and lover of Shōgun Tokugawa Ienobu and held numerous important posts within the administration of the Tokugawa shogunate. He was also daimyō of Takasaki Domain and later of Murakami Domain.

Akifusa was the son of Nishida Kiyosada, a retainer of Tokugawa Tsunashige, the daimyō of Kofu Domain. He was initially apprenticed to a sarugaku theatre troupe, but in 1684 became a page to Tokugawa Tsunatoyo. His family name was changed to "Manabe" around this time. He rose rapidly through the ranks due to his special relationship with Tsunashige, and by 1704 was counted as a member of his inner entourage, and had been awarded with the courtesy title of Echizen-no-kami, and court rank of Junior Fifth Rank, Lower Grade. In 1705 his income was increased to 3,000 koku, but in 1706 he was named a deputy wakadoshiyori and granted additional estates in Sagami Province which brought his income to over the 10,000 koku mark required to become a daimyō. The same year, his court rank was increased to Junior Fifth Rank, Lower Grade, and he was nominated deputy rōjū. In 1710, his income was increased to 50,000 koku and he became daimyō of Takasaki Domain. This rise in status of a person who was originally a member of the despised profession of "entertainer" to a daimyō and senior official in the  government was unprecedented and was largely due to the backing of Shōgun Tokugawa Ienobu and his successor Tokugawa Ietsugu. 

Akifusa was noted for his backing of the  Confucianist, scholar-bureaucrat Arai Hakuseki as a "brain" for the Tokugawa shogunate and his economic and political reform program. Especially under the tenure of the young Tokugawa Ietsugu, Akifuse wielded tremendous influence as a sobayōnin. After Ietsugu died and was replaced by Tokugawa Yoshimune, Akifusa's influence went into rapid decline. He was relieved of all offices within the shogunate, and was transferred from  Takasaki to the more remote Murakami Domain on the Sea of Japan in 1717. He died at Murakami in 1720 at the age of 54. As he had no male heir, he adopted his younger brother, Manabe Akitoki as heir. His grave is at the temple of Jōnen-ji in Murakami.

Shortly after Akifusa's death, Manabe Akitoki was transferred to the newly-created Sabae Domain, where his descendants lived to the Meiji restoration.

References

Papinot, Edmond. (1948). Historical and Geographical Dictionary of Japan. New York: Overbeck Co.

External links
Murakami Domain on "Edo 300 HTML" (3 November 2007) 
Sabae Domain on "Edo 300 HTML" (3 November 2007) 

17th-century Japanese LGBT people
18th-century Japanese LGBT people
1666 births
1720 deaths
Fudai daimyo
Male lovers of royalty
Manabe clan
People of Edo-period Japan